Charles Denby Jr. (November 14, 1861 – February 15, 1938) was an American diplomat in China and later in Vienna, Austria, and was known as one of the top scholars of Chinese language and culture of his time.

Life
Charles Denby Jr. was born in Evansville, Indiana, to Charles H. Denby, who served as US Minister to China for many years, and Martha Fitch. His maternal grandfather, Graham N. Fitch was a United States representative and Senator. His brother, Edwin Denby, was a United States Representative and United States Secretary of the Navy. Charles was educated by private tutors before receiving his B.A.  from Princeton University in 1882.

Career
In 1885, Charles Jr. accompanied his father to China as second secretary to the US legation, and in 1894 he was promoted to first secretary.

After increasing incidents of riots against missionaries in China (such as the ones in 1891 in Nanking and I-chang and 1895 in Chengdu) he became a supporter of a stronger US government support of American missionaries in China (cf. Hunt, chapter 5).

During the First Sino-Japanese War, he mediated many of the negotiations between China and Japan, and was the chief draftsman of the Treaty of Shimonoseki that ended the war. In 1900, he was appointed as secretary general of the provisional government in Tientsin, China during the Boxer Rebellion, and then from 1902 to 1905 he served as the chief foreign adviser to the Viceroy of Zhili, Yuan Shikai.

In 1905, he returned to the United States to become chief clerk in the State Department.  In 1907, he returned to China as United States Consul General in Shanghai and two years later in 1909 was made Consul General in Vienna where he served until 1915. From 1915 to 1917 he served as president of Hupp Motor Car Company in Detroit.  When America entered WWI, he re-joined the foreign service and became Director of the Bureau of Foreign Agents of the War Trade Board.  In 1918 he went to China as a special agent of the State Department and was special representative of the United States Shipping Board in China and Japan during 1922 to 1923. Charles retired in 1923 to Washington, D.C., where he later died.

Marriage and children

Denby married Martha Dalzell Orr in 1895. They had three sons James Denby (also in the foreign service), Charles Denby, and Edwin Denby, a noted dance critic and poet.

See also 
 List of law clerks of the Supreme Court of the United States (Seat 2)

References

External links
The Denby Family Papers at The Library of Congress

1861 births
1938 deaths
Princeton University alumni
Law clerks of the Supreme Court of the United States
American diplomats
People from Evansville, Indiana
Consuls general of the United States in Shanghai